In mathematics, especially in the area of algebra known as group theory, the holomorph of a group is a group that simultaneously contains (copies of) the group and its automorphism group.  The holomorph provides interesting examples of groups, and allows one to treat group elements and group automorphisms in a uniform context. In group theory, for a group , the holomorph of  denoted  can be described as a semidirect product or as a permutation group.

Hol(G) as a semidirect product
If  is the automorphism group of  then

where the multiplication is given by
 [Eq. 1]

which is well defined, since  and therefore .

For example, 
  the cyclic group of order 3
  where 
  with the multiplication given by:

Observe, for example

Hol(G) as a permutation group

A group G acts naturally on itself by left and right multiplication, each giving rise to a homomorphism from G into the symmetric group on the underlying set of G.  One homomorphism is defined as λ: G → Sym(G), (h) = g·h. That is, g is mapped to the permutation obtained by left-multiplying each element of G by g.  Similarly, a second homomorphism ρ: G → Sym(G) is defined by (h) = h·g−1, where the inverse ensures that (k) = ((k)).  These homomorphisms are called the left and right regular representations of G.  Each homomorphism is injective, a fact referred to as Cayley's theorem.

For example, if G = C3 = {1, x, x2 } is a cyclic group of order three, then
 (1) = x·1 = x,
 (x) = x·x = x2, and
 (x2) = x·x2 = 1,
so λ(x) takes (1, x, x2) to (x, x2, 1).

The image of λ is a subgroup of Sym(G) isomorphic to G, and its normalizer in Sym(G) is defined to be the holomorph N of G.  
For each n in N and g in G, there is an h in G such that n· = ·n. If an element n of the holomorph fixes the identity of G, then for 1 in G, (n·)(1) = (·n)(1), but the left hand side is n(g), and the right side is h. In other words, if n in N fixes the identity of G, then for every g in G, n· = λ(n(g))·n. If g, h are elements of G, and n is an element of N fixing the identity of G, then applying this equality twice to n·· and once to the (equivalent) expression n·λ(g·h) gives that n(g)·n(h) = n(g·h). That is, every element of N that fixes the identity of G is in fact an automorphism of G.  Such an n normalizes , and the only  that fixes the identity is λ(1).

Properties
 ρ(G) ∩ Aut(G) = 1
 Aut(G) normalizes ρ(G) so that canonically ρ(G)Aut(G) ≅ G ⋊ Aut(G)
 since λ(g)ρ(g)(h) = ghg−1 ( is the group of inner automorphisms of G.)
 K ≤ G is a characteristic subgroup if and only if λ(K) ⊴ Hol(G)

References
 
 

Group theory
Group automorphisms